University Practice Senior High School (UPSHS) is a second cycle institution at Cape Coast in the Central Region of Ghana.

References

High schools and secondary schools in Ghana
Cape Coast